The Clinton Public School District is a public school district based in Clinton, Mississippi (USA).

Schools
School segregation in the district ended in 1970. In fulfilling desegregation requirements, the district implemented a setup in which every student attends each school within the district. Prior to desegregation Sumner Hill and Lovett served Clinton's African American students.

Schools
 Secondary schools
 Grades 10-12: Clinton High School
 Grade 9: Sumner Hill Junior High School
 Grades 7-8: Clinton Junior High School
 Elementary schools
Grade 6: Lovett Elementary School
Grades 4-5: Eastside Elementary School
Grades 2-3: Northside Elementary School
Grades K-1: Clinton Park Elementary School
 Other Campuses
Clinton High School Career Complex (Grades 10-12)
Clinton Alternative School

Demographics and student performance
In 2017 the district's student body was over 52% black and 39% white, and about 40% of students were enrolled in free or reduced lunch programs, a marker of low socioeconomic status. Less than half of the teaching staff was black. Under Mississippi state accountability rankings the school made an "A". Sierra Mannie stated that the "intentional integration" done by the district, ensuring that schools remained racially integrated, as well as the community's rate of low income residents only being 15.5%, meant that it received academic performance that was "an apparent anomaly" as schools with majority black student bodies tended to have lower achievement. Mannie wrote that all of the schools performed well because there were no alternative schools in which parents could self-segregate to.

2006-07 school year
There were a total of 4,859 students enrolled in the Clinton Public School District during the 2006–2007 school year. The gender makeup of the district was 50% female and 50% male. The racial makeup of the district was 47.73% African American, 47.97% White, 3.09% Asian, 1.09% Hispanic, and 0.12% Native American. 28.9% of the district's students were eligible to receive free lunch.

Accountability statistics

See also
List of school districts in Mississippi

References

External links
 

Education in Hinds County, Mississippi
School districts in Mississippi
School districts in the Jackson metropolitan area, Mississippi